(Van) de(r) Werve is a Flemish surname. It may refer to:

 Noble House of van de Werve, dating back to the 13th century
 Guido van der Werve (born 1977), Dutch filmmaker and visual artist
 Claus de Werve (c. 1380 – 1439), Dutch sculptor
 

 
Dutch-language surnames
Surnames of Dutch origin